John Paul "J. P." Kepka (born March 6, 1984) is a short track speed skater from the United States who won bronze in the 5000m relay at the 2006 Winter Olympics in Turin. Kepka also represented the U.S. in the 2002 Salt Lake City Winter Olympics.

He was born in St. Louis, Missouri, and skated for the Metros Speed Skating Club.  He is the first male St. Louisian to win a medal in speed skating.

External links 
 J.P.'s U.S. Olympic Team bio
 
J. P. Kepka at ISU

1984 births
Living people
American male short track speed skaters
Short track speed skaters at the 2006 Winter Olympics
Olympic bronze medalists for the United States in short track speed skating
Medalists at the 2006 Winter Olympics